The list of ship launches in 1939 includes a chronological list of all ships launched in 1939.

References

Sources

1939
Ship launches